Néstor Gabriel Martinena (born 22 January 1987 in Necochea, Buenos Aires) is an Argentine football forward currently playing for Club Círculo Deportivo. He has spent all of his career prior to moving to Dinamo with Gimnasia de La Plata.

External links 
 Argentine Primera statistics  
 Team page at ESPN.com
 

1987 births
Living people
Argentine footballers
Argentine expatriate footballers
Argentine people of Basque descent
Sportspeople from Buenos Aires Province
Association football forwards
Club Atlético Platense footballers
Club de Gimnasia y Esgrima La Plata footballers
FK Dinamo Tirana players
Cobresal footballers
Gimnasia y Esgrima de Jujuy footballers
Defensa y Justicia footballers
Boca Unidos footballers
Club Atlético Brown footballers
Sportivo Belgrano footballers
Fuerza Amarilla S.C. footballers
Sportivo Desamparados footballers
FC Kamza players
Chilean Primera División players
Torneo Federal A players
Primera Nacional players
Primera B Metropolitana players
Argentine Primera División players
Ecuadorian Serie A players
Kategoria Superiore players
Expatriate footballers in Albania
Argentine expatriate sportspeople in Albania
Expatriate footballers in Ecuador
Argentine expatriate sportspeople in Ecuador
Expatriate footballers in Chile
Argentine expatriate sportspeople in Chile